

Bolton

Chequerbent (1831 station)
Chequerbent (1885 station)

Darcy Lever
Horwich

Bury
Ainsworth Road Halt
Bradley Fold
Brandlesholme Road Halt
Bury Bolton Street (now preserved, as part of the East Lancashire Railway)
Bury Knowsley Street

Molyneux Brow

Radcliffe Bridge
Ringley Road

Withins Lane

Manchester
Baguley
Chorlton-cum-Hardy
Clayton Bridge
Dean Lane (converted to Metrolink)
Didsbury
Fallowfield
High Street (Metrolink)
Hyde Road
Levenshulme South
Longsight
Manchester Central

Manchester Mayfield

Miles Platting
Mosley Street (Metrolink)
Newton Heath
Northenden
Park

Woodlands Road (Metrolink)

Oldham

Derker (converted to Metrolink)

Failsworth (converted to Metrolink)

Grasscroft

Hollinwood (converted to Metrolink)
Lees

Middleton Junction
Moorgate
Oldham Central
Oldham Clegg Street
Oldham Glodwick Road
Oldham Mumps (converted to Metrolink)

Oldham Werneth
Royton
Royton Junction

Shaw & Crompton (converted to Metrolink)

Rochdale

Middleton
Milnrow (converted to Metrolink)
New Hey (converted to Metrolink)

Salford
Agecroft Bridge
Barton Moss
Cadishead
Cross Lane

Ellenbrook
Irlams o' th' Height

Manchester Exchange
Monton Green

Ordsall Lane
Pendlebury
Pendleton
Pendleton Bridge
Seedley
Walkden Low Level
Weaste
Worsley

Stockport
Cheadle (Cheshire Lines)
Cheadle (LNWR)
Cheadle Heath
Hazel Grove (Midland)
Heaton Mersey
Heaton Norris
Stockport Portwood
Stockport Tiviot Dale
High Lane
Middlewood Higher

Tameside
Ashton Moss
Ashton Oldham Road
Ashton Park Parade
Audenshaw
Droylsden
Dukinfield & Ashton
Dukinfield Central
Godley East
Hooley Hill

Park Bridge

Trafford
Altrincham (1st)
Bowdon
Broadheath

Dunham (W&SR)

Partington
West Timperley

Wigan
Astley
Atherleigh
Atherton Bag Lane

Hindley Green
Hindley South

Leigh
Lower Ince
Pennington
Plank Lane
Platt Bridge
Tyldesley
West Leigh
West Leigh & Bedford

See also
List of railway stations in Greater Manchester

Lists of railway stations in Great Britain
 Closed
Railway stations